Akoumokoumo is a village in western Benin. It is located in Savalou commune in the Collines Department.

Nearby towns and villages include Alekpo (1.0 nm), Pepelou (1.0 nm), Amou (6.3 nm), Abala (3.2 nm), Lekpa (1.4 nm) and Abeokouta (4.0 nm).

References

External links
Satellite map at Maplandia.com

Populated places in Benin